The ice hockey competition was one of the events held at the 2015 Winter Deaflympics.

Participating nations

Preliminary round

All times are local (UTC+5).

Bronze medal game

Gold medal game

References 

Deaflympics
2015 Winter Deaflympics